The Pan-American Students Conference was a student conference held in Bogotá, Colombia, in April 1948. The conference was organized in opposition to the Pan-American Conference also held in Bogotá. The conference was attended by a young Fidel Castro.

On April 8 an organizational meeting in office of the Confederation of Workers of Colombia. A second meeting is claimed to have happened on April 9. Not long after that Gaitán was shot, leading to the Bogotazo.

References

Cova, Antonio Rafael De la. "The Moncada Attack: Birth of the Cuban Revolution" Univ of South Carolina Press, 2007 https://books.google.com/books?id=rfMvP7aaz_oC&
Martin, Gerald "Gabriel Garcia Marquez" Knopf Doubleday Publishing Group, 2009 https://books.google.com/books?id=HNonyuD8ZKcC&s
Alape Arturo. "Fidel Castro reveals role in 9 april 1948 colombian uprising" (interview with Fidel Castro) El Siglo, Bogotá 11 Apr 1982 originally in Spanish, archive: http://lanic.utexas.edu/project/castro/db/1982/19820411.html

Pan-American Students Conference, 1948
Students Conference, 1948
1948 conferences
April 1948 events in South America